The 2000 Mobiline Phone Pals season was the 11th season of the franchise in the Philippine Basketball Association (PBA) and fourth season under the banner Mobiline.

Draft picks

Transactions

Occurrences
Midway through the All-Filipino Cup Finals, coach Eric Altamirano, along with assistants Ryan Gregorio and Frankie Lim, were sacked by Mobiline following a poor start. They were replaced by Louie Alas and assistants Aric del Rosario and Ariel Vanguardia.

Fil-Tongan Paul Asi Taulava was ordered to be deported by the Bureau of Immigration for failure to provide sufficient evidence regarding his citizenship issue and his fate was decided on March 29.

Roster

Elimination round

Games won

References

TNT Tropang Giga seasons
Mobiline